The  were a class of patrol boats of the Imperial Japanese Navy (IJN), serving during World War II. 9 vessels were converted from s and 1 vessel was converted from a  in 1940.

Background
In 1939, the IJN was liberated from London Naval Treaty, and they built many s. On the other hand, aging of the Momi-class destroyers was serious. Their boilers were degraded due to the operating conditions present in destroyers. Some Momi-class destroyers were not able to show 30 knots speed. The Navy General Staff made the Confidential Document No. 456. It was an order to rebuild them into patrol boats - about four s and six Momi-class destroyers. The IJN chose nine Momi class and one Wakatake class. Three Momis and one Wakatake were increased, because two Minekazes were decreased.

Rebuilding
 Ten vessels were sent to dockyards for rebuilding. "Q" turret, all of torpedo tubes and one boiler were removed in 1940.
 In the second half of 1941, the IJN rebuilt them once again for war preparations. They were rebuilt to the landing craft carrier. The Y turret was moved to a place of the "Q" turret. As for the No. 31 and the No. 46, those rebuilt were not done.

Service
 10 and 23 December 1941: Sortie for the Battle of Wake Island. (No. 32 and No. 33)
 12 December 1941: Sortie for the invasion of Legazpi. (No. 34, No. 35 and No. 36)
 20 December 1941: Sortie for invasion of Davao. (No. 36 and No. 37)
 25 December 1941: Sortie for invasion of Jolo. (No. 36 and No. 37)
 11 January 1942: Sortie for the Battle of Tarakan. (No. 36, No. 37 and No. 38)
 11 January 1942: Sortie for the Battle of Manado. (No. 34, No. 1 and No. 2)
 31 January 1942: Sortie for the Battle of Ambon. (No. 34 and No. 39)
 20 February 1942: Sortie for invasion of Kupang. (No. 39, No. 1 and No. 2)
 1 March 1942: Sortie for invasion of Surabaya. (No. 34, No. 36, No. 37, No. 38 and No. 39)
 31 March 1942: Sortie for the Battle of Christmas Island. (No. 34 and No. 36)
 (after): The IJN which finished First Phase Operations allotted them to the convoy escort operations. Only No. 36 was survived war.

Ships in classes

No. 31 class

No. 46 class
No. 40 to No. 45 were a space to the vessels numbers. These numbers were going to be given to all of Wakatakes.

Photos

See also
 High speed transport
 No.1-class patrol boat
 
 
 
 Battle of Wake Island

Footnotes

Bibliography
, History of Pacific War Vol.62 Ships of the Imperial Japanese Forces, Gakken (Japan), January 2008, 
Ships of the World special issue Vol.45, Escort Vessels of the Imperial Japanese Navy, (Japan), February 1996
The Maru Special, Japanese Naval Vessels No.49, Japanese submarine chasers and patrol boats,  (Japan), March 1981

World War II naval ships of Japan
Momi-class destroyers
Wakatake-class destroyers
Landing craft
Patrol vessels of the Imperial Japanese Navy